Edoardo Colferai (born 21 May 2002) is an Italian footballer who plays as a forward for Italian club VillaValle.

Career

Early career 
Born in Milan, Italy, on 21 May 2002, Colferai began his youth career at local club Vimodronese between 2008 and 2011. He then played for Cimiano for two seasons, joining Pro Sesto for the 2013–14 season.

Monza

2014–2021: Youth career 
In 2014, Colferai moved to Monza's youth system. Initially starting with the under-13 team, Colferai had a short stint at Renate's under-15s in the 2016–17 season; he played for Monza's under-16s in the 2017–18 season. Colferai was promoted to the under-17s in 2018–19, where he scored five goals.

The following season he played for the under-19s in the Campionato Nazionale Dante Berretti. During the 2020–21 season, Colferai played with the under-19s in the Campionato Primavera 2; he scored nine goals and made two assists between the league and cup.

2020: Senior debut 
Coming through the youth system, Colferai made his senior professional debut for Monza on 27 October 2020, in a Coppa Italia third round match against Pordenone. He was sent off in the 41st minute after receiving a second yellow card; Monza won the match on penalties.

VillaValle 
On 8 July 2021, Colferai joined Serie D side VillaValle on a permanent transfer.

Style of play 
Colferai is a forward who is capable of playing as a winger on both flanks, or as a second striker. He is right-footed, and is noted for his technique, ball control and dribbling.

References

External links 
 
 

2002 births
Living people
Footballers from Milan
Italian footballers
Association football forwards
Pro Sesto 2013 players
A.C. Monza players
A.C. Renate players
Serie D players